Machino is a rural locality (a village) in Klyapovskoye Rural Settlement, Beryozovsky District, Perm Krai, Russia. The population was 104 as of 2010.

Geography 
It is located on the Barda River.

References 

Rural localities in Beryozovsky District, Perm Krai